The 1943 NCAA basketball tournament involved eight schools playing in single-elimination play to determine the national champion of men's NCAA Division I college basketball. It began on March 24, 1943, and ended with the championship game on March 30 in New York City. A total of nine games were played, including a third place game in each region. Top-ranked Illinois declined to participate in the NCAA tournament or NIT after three of its starters were drafted into the Army.

Wyoming, coached by Everett Shelton, won the national title with a 46–34 victory in the final game over Georgetown, coached by Elmer Ripley. Ken Sailors of Wyoming was named the tournament's Most Outstanding Player. The Cowboys were the first team in the 5-year history of the tournament to win after making a previous appearance in the tournament, having appeared in the 1941 tournament.

Locations
Only two venues hosted the 1943 tournament:

Regionals

March 24 and 25
East Regional, Madison Square Garden, New York, New York
March 26 and 27
West Regional, Municipal Auditorium, Kansas City, Missouri

Championship Game

March 30
Madison Square Garden, New York, New York

For the third straight year, the Municipal Auditorium was the site of the West regional games, but unlike the previous two years, it was not the site of the championship game. This honor fell for the first time to the Madison Square Garden in New York, the country's most prestigious arena at the time. The Garden also hosted the East Regional for the first time, ending a streak of three straight years of it being west of the Appalachians and four straight years of being on a college campus (although the arena did, at the time, host many of the local college teams as an alternate venue). This marked the first of seven times in eight years that the tournament did not feature any college arenas, the only seven times to date for this to happen. The same span saw the same venues used every year except 1949, when Hec Edmundson Pavilion in Seattle hosted the championship game.

Teams

Bracket

Regional third place

See also
 1943 National Invitation Tournament
 1943 NAIA Basketball Tournament

References

NCAA Division I men's basketball tournament
Ncaa